In audio processing and sound reinforcement, an insert is an access point built into the mixing console, allowing the audio engineer to add external line level devices into the signal flow between the microphone preamplifier and the mix bus.

Common usages include gating, compressing, equalizing and for reverb effects that are specific to that channel or group. Inserts can be used as an alternate way to route signals such as for multitrack recording output or line level direct input.

Insert jacks
Inserts can be balanced or unbalanced. Typically, higher-end mixers will have balanced inserts and entry level mixers will have unbalanced inserts. Balanced inserts appear as a pair of jacks, one serving as the send (out from the mixer) and the other serving as the return (back to the mixer.) Balanced insert jacks can be XLR, 1/4" TRS phone connector or Bantam TT. 

Unbalanced inserts can also be a pair of jacks such as RCA or 1/4" TS (Tip Sleeve) phone connector. Again, one jack serves as send and the other serves as return. 

Most modern entry level and medium format mixers use a single TRS phone jack for both Send and Return. This dual-purpose insert jack only has three conductors, and balanced lines need at least two conductors. Because two lines share the same three-conductor insert jack, its architecture is necessarily unbalanced, with the two circuits sharing a common ground. Of the mixers using this kind of dual-purpose insert jack, most are designed with Tip Send, Ring Return, though many can still be found with Ring Send, Tip Return. A very few mixers have both architectures present on the same mixer; Tip Send for input channels and Tip Return for mix groups.

Insert jacks are often normalized so that signal is passed through the jack if nothing is inserted but is interrupted when the jack is holding a plug. Inserts with two separate jacks will have normalizing such that the Return jack interrupts signal but the Send jack doesn't. The Send jack can always be counted on to send signal out to external devices. A refinement of the normalization of jacks is the presence on the mixer of an insert ON/OFF button which allows the user to patch into or around the inserted devices at will without having to physically disconnect the insert cables.

Unbalanced TRS phone inserts are normalized as well. The presence of a plug in the jack breaks normal internal signal flow, sending signal out to external devices and returning this signal to the channel. TRS phone jacks can be specially wired with Tip and Ring connected at the insert end, and both conductors going to Tip at the distant end. This allows for tapping the insert point for its signal without interrupting signal flow inside the mixer. A less reliable method to achieve the same end is to insert a TS or TRS phone plug halfway into the insert until there is a springy "click" feeling, at which point the plug is contacting the signal within the insert jack, but isn't breaking the normalized contact. The "half-click" method works fine until the insert cable is jarred or wiggled, causing noise or a loss of signal within the channel.

Because of the combination of balanced external devices and unbalanced insert jacks, the process of inserting involves finding out which devices have which kinds of output configurations. Full electronic balancing needs a different cabling style than transformer balancing, which in turn needs a different cabling style than impedance balancing. Mistakes in the interconnection may make the inserted signal drop in level by 6 dB or add hum and buzz or even overheat a balanced output circuit on the external device, decreasing its usable life.

Insert jacks themselves can be the source of intermittent signal problems. Internal jack contacts may get too loose over time and they may oxidize, impeding electrical conduction. Regular use of the jack helps keep oxidization down. The manufacturer using high quality jacks and good assembly practices helps reduce failures over time.

Another problem with TRS, TS and TT jacks that come in Send/Return pairs is that the Send jack and plug look just like the Return jack and plug. Cross-patching mistakes are possible, resulting in no signal passing through the insert.

Mixer implementation
Inserts on analog mixers appear in various locations in the signal flow, depending on the vision of the designer. Most inserts tap the signal after the microphone preamplifier and after the high-pass filter (HPF) (if present.) Others tap the signal after the channel EQ and before the fader. A few tap the signal after the fader and before the mix buses. Many consoles offer a choice between two, three or four of the possible insert points by a combination of internal jumpers or links that a skilled technician can modify. 

Digital consoles are often designed to allow the user to move the virtual insert point before or after the channel EQ and some allow the insert point to be placed after the fader and before the mix buses. These are "soft" changes; the options depend largely upon the design of the mixer's user interface and the breadth of processing power devoted to the insert function. 

Inserted devices can be connected in series to create a string of inserted devices. For instance, one could connect a gate, a compressor and an equalizer in series through the same channel's insert. 

Some digital mixers allow multiple effects to be inserted virtually, still others allow multiple third party plugins to be used as virtual inserts.

Inserts might be found on monoaural mixer inputs, monoaural and stereo subgroups, auxiliary inputs, main outputs and matrix outputs, but are rarely found on stereo line level inputs. EQs are commonly inserted on monitor mixer output mixes so that the monitor engineer can use his own wedge and the PFL/Solo bus to hear what the artist's wedge sounds like without having to climb on stage to check.

Signal levels
Similar to input preamplifiers and outputs, insert points are found at a variety of signal levels. Most are designed to handle a nominal -10 dBV consumer line level or +4 dBu professional line level, although variations may be found. Most balanced inserts are at +4 dBu nominal level. Both analog and digital designs include sufficient headroom to allow transients exceeding the nominal level to be handled without distortion. For example, a digital console's inserts might be designed such that a +4 dBu signal corresponds to a -20 dBFS digital representation, effectively yielding 20 dB of headroom. For optimal gain staging and the least amount of system hiss, inserted devices should be chosen with regard to the signal levels both they and the  mixer can handle, the ideal gain staging being achieved when the levels of both insert and inserted device match.

See also
Balanced
Patch bay

References 

Sound
Electrical signal connectors